Drums Around the Corner is a jazz album by Art Blakey which was mainly recorded in 1958, but not released until 1999.

The album comprises two sessions. The main session, recorded by Rudy Van Gelder at Manhattan Towers, New York City on November 2, 1958, is effectively a showcase for an all-star lineup drummers consisting of Blakey, Philly Joe Jones, Roy Haynes and Ray Barretto (on congas). They are supported by the regular members of the Jazz Messenger at the time, Lee Morgan (trumpet), Bobby Timmons (piano) and Jymie Merritt (bass).

The later session was a duet between Blakey and bassist Paul Chambers, recorded at the Van Gelder Studio in Hackensack, NJ on March 29, 1959.

Track listing
All pieces by Art Blakey, except where noted.

"Moose the Mooche'" (Parker) – 15:19
"Blakey's Blues" – 11:07
"Lee's Tune" (Lee Morgan) – 8:26
"Let's Take 16 Bars" – 6:13
"Drums in the Rain" – 11:13
"Lover" (Rodgers, Hart) – 7:24
"I've Got My Love to Keep Me Warm" (Berlin) – 7:11
"What Is This Thing Called Love?" (Porter) – 5:43

Personnel
Tracks 1-6
Lee Morgan – trumpet
Bobby Timmons – piano
Jymie Merritt – bass
Art Blakey, Philly Joe Jones – drums, timpani
Roy Haynes – drums
Ray Barretto – congas

Tracks 7-8
Paul Chambers – bass
Art Blakey – drums

References

1999 albums
Art Blakey albums
Blue Note Records albums
Albums produced by Alfred Lion